Frederick Robert Yule (7 October 1893, Norfolk – 11 December 1982, Southend-on-Sea) was an English character actor, comedian and singer, mainly known for his appearances in post-war BBC Radio programmes such as ITMA, Ray's a Laugh, Band Waggon (1947 era) and The Archers.

He began his stage career as a singer in pantomime, West End musicals and music hall. He first broadcast in 1925, as the vocalist with Herman Darewski's orchestra. After that he became a prolific broadcaster with a wide range, including variety, drama, features, talks, and programmes for young listeners. His voice was well known to a generation of radio listeners as the one that stopped "the mighty roar of London's traffic" at the start of each episode of In Town Tonight. He also provided more than one voice in a radio adaptation of "Three Men in a Boat" by Hubert Gregg. This was repeated, after many years in the archives, on BBC Radio 4 extra. His sole film appearance was in The Charcoal-Burner's Son (1939).

He was married to music hall actress Doreen Monte.

References

1893 births
1982 deaths
English male radio actors
English male comedians
Actors from Norfolk
20th-century English comedians